This is a list of Buddhist temples, monasteries, stupas, and pagodas in Japan for which there are Wikipedia articles, sorted by prefecture.

Ehime
 Kanjizai-ji

Fukui

 Eihei-ji

Fukuoka
 Nanzoin
 Shōfuku-ji

Gifu
 Eihō-ji
 Shōgen-ji
 Shōhō-ji

Hiroshima
 Ankoku-ji
 Buttsū-ji
 Myōō-in

Hyōgo
 Antai-ji
 Chōkō-ji
 Engyō-ji
 Hōrin-ji
 Hōun-ji
 Ichijō-ji
 Jōdo-ji in Ono
 Kakurin-ji in Kakogawa
 Sagami-ji
 Taisan-ji in Kobe

Iwate
 Chūson-ji
 Mōtsū-ji

Kagawa

 Motoyama-ji
 Ōkubo-ji
 Sanuki Kokubun-ji
 Yashima-ji
 Zentsū-ji

Kanagawa
 Engaku-ji
 Hōkoku-ji
 Kenchō-ji
 Kōtoku-in
 Sōji-ji

Kōchi
  Chikurin-ji
 Dainichi-ji
 Hotsumisaki-ji
 Kongōchō-ji
 Kōnomine-ji
 Shinshō-ji
 Tosa_Kokubun-ji
 Zenjibu-ji
 Zenrakuji

Kyoto

 Adashino Nenbutsu-ji
 Byōdō-in
 Chion-in (Head temple of the Jōdo-shū Buddhist sect)
 Daigo-ji
 Daikaku-ji
 Daitoku-ji
 Eikan-dō Zenrin-ji (Head temple of the Seizan branch of Jōdo-shū)
 Ginkaku-ji (Temple of the Silver Pavilion)
 Higashi-Honganji (Head temple of the Ōtani-ha branch within the Jōdo Shinshū school)
 Kinkaku-ji (Rokuonji, Deer Garden Temple, Temple of the Golden Pavilion)
 Kiyomizu-dera
 Kōdai-ji
 Kōzan-ji
 Manpuku-ji (Ōbaku temple at Uji)
 Myōshin-ji
 Nanzen-ji
 Ninna-ji
 Nishi-Honganji (Head temple of the Honganji-ha branch within the Jōdo Shinshū school)
 Ryōan-ji
 Saihō-ji
 Sanjūsangen-dō
 Shinnyō-ji
 Tenryū-ji (major temple of the Rinzai school)
 Tōfuku-ji
 Manju-ji
 Tō-ji

Mie
 Honzan Senju-ji (Head temple of the Takada branch within the Jōdo Shinshū school)

Miyagi
 Zuigan-ji

Nagano
  Anraku-ji
 Zenkō-ji

Nagasaki
 Fukusai-ji
 Sōfuku-ji in Nagasaki

Nagoya
 Arako Kannon

Nara

 Asuka-dera
 Daian-ji
 Gangō-ji
 Hase-dera
 Hōki-ji
 Hokke-ji
 Hōryū-ji
 Kimpusen-ji
 Kōfuku-ji
 Ōminesan-ji
 Murō-ji
 Saidai-ji
 Shin-Yakushi-ji
 Taima-dera
 Tōdai-ji
 Tōshōdai-ji
 Yakushi-ji

Okayama
 Inryō-ji

Osaka
 Shitennō-ji (the first Buddhist and oldest officially administered temple in Japan)

Saitama
 Heirin-ji

Shiga

 Eigen-ji
 Enryaku-ji (Temple complex on a mountain northeast of the city)
 Ishiyama-dera
 Mii-dera

Shizuoka
 Ryūtaku-ji
 Shōgen-ji
 Taiseki-ji

Tochigi
 Rinnō-ji
 Hon-ji Senju-ji

Tokushima
 Anraku-ji
  Byōdō-ji
 Dainichi-ji
 Gokuraku-ji
 Hōrin-ji
 Jizō-ji
 Jōraku-ji
 Jūraku-ji
 Kannon-ji
 Kirihata-ji
 Konsen-ji
 Kumadani-ji
 Onzan-ji
 Ryōzen-ji
 Tatsue-ji
 Yakuo-ji

Tokyo
 Kan'ei-ji
 Sengaku-ji
 Sensō-ji (temple complex)
 Shōfuku-ji in Higashimurayama
 Tsukiji_Hongan-ji
 Zōjō-ji

Toyama
 Kokutai-ji

Wakayama

 Chōhō-ji
 Fudarakusan-ji
 Jison-in
 Mount Kōya (temple complex)
 Kongōbu-ji
 Negoro-ji
 Seiganto-ji

Yamagata
 Yama-dera

Yamaguchi
 Kōzan-ji in Shimonoseki

Yamanashi
 Kōgaku-ji
 Kuon-ji

See also 
 Buddhism in Japan
 Daibutsu
 Japanese Buddhist architecture
 Shinbutsu-shūgō
 List of Buddhist temples
 List of National Treasures of Japan (temples)

Notes

External links

 BuddhaNet's Comprehensive Directory of Buddhist Temples sorted by country
 Buddhactivity Dharma Centres database

 
 
Japan
Buddhist temples